Gay is a term that now primarily refers to a homosexual person or the trait of being homosexual. The term was originally used to mean "carefree", "cheerful", or "bright and showy".

Gay may also refer to:

Places

In Europe
Gay, Russia, several inhabited localities
Gay Street, Bath, Somerset, England
Gay Street, West Sussex, England

In North America
Gay, Georgia, United States, a town
Gay, Michigan, United States, an unincorporated community
Gay, North Carolina, United States, an unincorporated community
Gay, Oklahoma, United States, an unincorporated community
Gay, West Virginia, United States, an unincorporated community
Gay Farm, an historic colonial house, Petersham, Massachusetts, United States
Gay Island, Nunavut, Canada
Gay Street (Baltimore), Maryland, United States
Gay Street (Knoxville), Tennessee, United States
Gay Street (Manhattan), New York, United States
Gay Township, Taylor County, Iowa, United States

People
Gay (given name)
Gay (surname)
Gay (nickname)

Arts, entertainment, and media
Gay (magazine), the first gay magazine in Toronto, Canada
Gay?, a 1996 EP by indie rock band 12 Rods

Transport
Gaya Airport, by IATA code
Gay class fast patrol boat, 12 boats that served with the British Royal Navy from the early 1950s

Other uses
G-A-Y, a nightclub in London
Gayo language, by ISO code
Gay, a consonant in Pitman shorthand
Gay Games, an international sporting and cultural event organized by and specifically for lesbian, gay, bisexual, and transgender (LGBT)
Tropical Storm Gay, a list of tropical cyclones

See also
Gai (disambiguation)
 Gay and Lesbian (disambiguation)
Gaye (disambiguation)
Gays, Illinois, United States, a village
Gaysky (disambiguation)